The 1988 Iowa State Cyclones football team represented Iowa State University during the 1988 NCAA Division I-A football season.  They played their home games at Cyclone Stadium in Ames, Iowa. They participated as members of the Big Eight Conference.  The team was coached by head coach Jim Walden.

Schedule

Personnel

Season summary

Tulane

Baylor

at Iowa

at Oklahoma

Northern Iowa

at Missouri

Kansas

at Colorado

Nebraska

at Kansas State

Oklahoma State

References

Iowa State
Iowa State Cyclones football seasons
Iowa State Cyclones football